Li Yeguang (December 19, 1924 – July 21, 2014) also known by his pen name Luo Mo, was a Chinese translator.

He was one of the main translators of the works of the American poet Walt Whitman into Chinese.

Biography
Li was born Li Guangjian in Lianyuan, Hunan in 1924.

Li started to publish works in 1942.

Li graduated from Peking University in 1951, where he majored in English. After graduation, Li was appointed an editor to the Chinese Academy of Social Sciences.

After the Cultural Revolution, Li joined the China Writers Association in 1979.

On July 21, 2014, Li died at his home in Hemet, California, United States.

Personal life
Li was married to Dai Kan in 1951 with three daughters: Li Xiaoyin, Li Xiaoya, Li Xiaoli.

Works
 Leaves of Grass (Walt Whitman)
 The Biography of Walt Whitman
 Gone With the Wind (Margaret Mitchell)
 The Lincoln Couple (Irving Stone)

Awards
 Chinese Translation Association – Competent Translator (2004)

References

1924 births
People from Loudi
Peking University alumni
People's Republic of China translators
English–Chinese translators
2014 deaths
20th-century Chinese translators
21st-century Chinese translators
Chinese expatriates in the United States